The McGill Redbirds football team represents McGill University in Canadian football in U Sports and is based in Montreal, Quebec. The program is one of the oldest in all of Canada, having begun organized competition in 1874. The team won its first collegiate championship in 1902 and also won in 1912, 1913, 1919, 1928, 1938 and 1960 prior to the inauguration of the Vanier Cup in 1965. McGill appeared in the Vanier Cup final in 1969, 1973 and 1987, with the Redmen finally winning the title in the 1987 game. McGill plays out of Percival Molson Memorial Stadium, where the Canadian Football League's Montreal Alouettes also play. 

The program had long used the Redmen moniker until the name was dropped in May 2019 after nearly 80% of students voted to change the name in a 2018 referendum held by McGill's student union. The team adopted the Redbirds name on November 17, 2020.

History 

In 1874, McGill and Harvard met in the first North American style football game. 

Old "Football Fightum" had been resurrected at Harvard in 1872, when Harvard resumed playing football. Harvard, however, had adopted a version of football which allowed carrying, albeit only when the player carrying the ball was being pursued. As a result of this, Harvard refused to attend the rules conference organized by the other schools and continued to play under its own code. While Harvard's voluntary absence from the meeting made it hard for them to schedule games against other American universities, it agreed to a challenge to play McGill University in a two-game series. Inasmuch as rugby football had been transplanted to Canada from England, the McGill team played under a set of rules which allowed a player to pick up the ball and run with it whenever he wished. Another rule, unique to McGill, was to count tries (the act of grounding the football past the opposing team's goal line; it is important to note that there was no end zone during this time), as well as goals, in the scoring. In the Rugby rules of the time, a touchdown only provided the chance to kick a free goal from the field. If the kick was missed, the touchdown did not count.

The McGill team traveled to Cambridge to meet Harvard. On May 14, 1874, the first game, played under Harvard's rules, was won by Harvard with a score of 3–0. The next day, the two teams played under "McGill" rugby rules to a scoreless tie. The games featured a round ball instead of a rugby-style oblong ball. This series of games represents an important milestone in the development of the modern game of American football. In October 1874, the Harvard team once again traveled to Montreal to play McGill in rugby, where they won by three tries.

From 1898, McGill played in the Canadian Intercollegiate Rugby Football Union, and won their first championship, the Yates Cup in 1902. In 1912, Frank Shaughnessy was recruited as the first professional head coach. His teams won the Yates Cup during his first two seasons. In 1919, the team went undefeated and did not concede a touchdown, and in 1928. The 1919 team was inducted into McGill's Hall of Fame in 2010.

McGill next won a championship in 1938. The team tied for the regular season 8–1 with Western after losing their final regular-season game to Western. The teams played off for the championship, won 9–0 by McGill, with all the scoring from kicker Herb Westman, who kicked a school record nine punt singles. The team would not win another title until 1960, when they won the Yates Cup, against Queen's University of Kingston, then defeated the Canada West champion Alberta Golden Bears in a challenge match for an unofficial national championship (Churchill Bowl).

In 1971, McGill joined a newly formed Quebec-only conference known as the Quebec University Athletic Association. In 1974, the three remaining Quebec teams merged with three Ontario teams in the Ontario-Quebec Intercollegiate Football Conference.

McGill won the ODIFC's Dunsmore Cup again for the first time 1987, along with the Montreal Shrine Bowl, Shaughnessy Cup, Robert Stanfield trophy (Atlantic Bowl champions) and the Vanier Cup (CIAU national champions). The 1987 team featured Michael Soles at running back, who went on to a lengthy playing career in the Canadian Football League. That team was coached by Charlie Baillie who took over in 1972 and served as head coach until 2000. Baillie surpassed the legendary Frank Shaughnessy's school record for wins and went on to become McGill's winningest coach. His overall record was 119–111–2.

Since the retirement of long-time head coach Charlie Baillie in 2000, the team has only won two league championships (2001, 2002). In October 2005, the McGill administration cancelled the last three games of football team's season after confirmed reports of hazing involving sexual abuse. After their 2005 suspension, the team struggled with three losing seasons, including two winless seasons in 2007 and 2008. The program showed signs of hope as the team won three games in 2009, but soon sank back down to futility with consecutive winless campaigns in 2010 and 2011. In 2012, the team qualified for the playoffs for the first time since 2006, but lost to perennial powerhouse Laval. The team returned to the playoffs in 2016, 2018 and 2019, but were defeated each time in blowout losses to the conference's other powerhouse, the Montreal Carabins.

Recent results

A. McGill was later awarded the Cup by forfeit after it was discovered that Laval had used ineligible players

Head coaches

Source: McGill.

National award winners
Hec Crighton Trophy: Dave Fleiszer (1969)
J. P. Metras Trophy: Randy Chevrier (2000), Laurent Duvernay-Tardif (2013), Andrew Seinet-Spaulding (2019)
Peter Gorman Trophy: Michael Soles (1986), Shaquille Johnson (2012), Eloa Latendresse-Regimbald (2022)
Russ Jackson Award: J.P. Veri (1990, 1991), Steve Papp (1994), Jean-Philippe Darche, (1998)
Frank Tindall Trophy: Chuck McMann (2002)

Notable former players

CFL
 Joshua Archibald – BC Lions
 Jesse Briggs – Winnipeg Blue Bombers
 Mike Edem – Saskatchewan Roughriders, BC Lions, Hamilton Tiger-Cats, Montreal Alouettes
 Tristan Fleury – Saskatchewan Roughriders
 Valentin Gnahoua – Hamilton Tiger-Cats
 Shaq Johnson – Ottawa Redblacks, BC Lions
 Maxime Rouyer – BC Lions, Panthers Wrocław, Edmonton Elks
 Andrew Seinet-Spaulding – Calgary Stampeders

NFL
 Laurent Duvernay-Tardif – New York Jets

Former professional players
 Jean-Nicolas Carrière – Toronto Argonauts
 Randy Chevrier – Edmonton Eskimos, Calgary Stampeders
 Ryan Coughlin – Montreal Alouettes
 J. P. Darche – Toronto Argonauts, Seattle Seahawks, Kansas City Chiefs
 Erik Galas – Montreal Alouettes
 Greg Hetherington –  Calgary Stampeders, BC Lions
 John Macdonald – Hamilton Tiger-Cats
 Christian Masotti – Edmonton Eskimos
 Jim Miller – Montreal Alouettes
 Joe Poirier – Ottawa Rough Riders
 Hector Pothier – Edmonton Eskimos
 Silver Quilty – Ottawa Rough Riders
 Val St. Germain – Hamilton Tiger-Cats, Edmonton Eskimos, Ottawa Renegades, Winnipeg Blue Bombers, Saskatchewan Roughriders
 Michael Soles – Edmonton Eskimos, Montreal Alouettes
 George Springate – Montreal Alouettes
 Gene Robillard – BC Lions

See also
U Sports

References

External links

 

McGill Redbirds

1874 establishments in Quebec
Canadian football teams in Montreal
Sports clubs established in 1874